Wood End Light Lookout Station is a historic lighthouse, located at the southwest end of Long Point in Provincetown, Massachusetts. It is located at Wood End, near the southernmost extent of the Provincetown Spit, and acts as a navigational aid to vessels on their approach to Provincetown Harbor. The Long Point Light Station, further down the peninsula at the tip of Long Point is an identical design and completed in 1875, three years after Wood End Light.

The light was first illuminated on November 20, 1872, and added to the National Register of Historic Places in 1987.  In 1981, Wood End Light became the first Massachusetts lighthouse to be converted to use solar energy to power the light and fog signal equipment.

In 1896 a wooden keeper's house was built, as well as a storage shed and oil house. With the changing times and no need to man the light station, it was decided in 1961 to raze the buildings leaving just the tower and oil house.

Notes

References

External links

Lighthouses completed in 1873
Lighthouses on the National Register of Historic Places in Massachusetts
Lighthouses in Barnstable County, Massachusetts
Provincetown, Massachusetts
National Register of Historic Places in Barnstable County, Massachusetts
1873 establishments in Massachusetts